Peter Skalicky (born 25 April 1941 in Berlin, Germany) is the former rector of TU Wien, Austria.

After taking his A-levels in Vienna, he studied physics at TU Wien. He wrote his PhD thesis on Röntgen topography. In 1973 he became an associate professor. Since 1979 he has been a full professor of applied physics. From 1991 until 2011 he was rector of TU Wien. He was followed in this function by Sabine Seidler.

Skalicky is vice chair on the Council of the University of Leoben.

He received an Officier dans l'Ordre national du mérite from the French ambassador. He is a member of the European Academy of Sciences and Arts.

References

Musicians from Berlin
German emigrants to Austria
TU Wien alumni
Academic staff of TU Wien
1941 births
Living people
Members of the European Academy of Sciences and Arts
Rectors of universities in Austria